Leandro Krysa (born 7 November 1992) is an Argentine chess player. He was awarded the title of Grandmaster (GM) by FIDE in 2017.

He played in the Chess World Cup 2017, where he was defeated in the first round by Li Chao.

References

External links 
 
 
 

1992 births
Living people
Argentine chess players
Chess grandmasters